During the 2001–02 season Cardiff City played in the Football League Division Two. They finished in fourth place before losing to Stoke City in the play-off semi finals after extra time in the second leg.

Squad

|}

Standings

Results by round

Fixtures and results

Division Two

Play-offs

FA Cup

 – Tiverton Town were drawn as the home side but the match was switched to Ninian Park.

League Cup

LDV Vans trophy

FAW Premier Cup

References

See also
 List of Cardiff City F.C. seasons
 2001–02 in English football

Cardiff City F.C. seasons
Cardiff City
Cardiff City